Sabine National Wildlife Refuge is a National Wildlife Refuge of the United States located in Cameron Parish in southwestern Louisiana. The western boundary of the Sabine Refuge is Sabine Lake, the inlet for Port Arthur, Texas, while the tip of the eastern end reaches Calcasieu Lake.

Southwest Louisiana National Wildlife Refuge Complex
The Southwest Louisiana National Wildlife Refuge Complex was formed by administratively combining of the East Cove National Wildlife Refuge, Lacassine National Wildlife Refuge, Cameron Prairie National Wildlife Refuge, Shell Keys National Wildlife Refuge, and Sabine in 2004.

Wildlife and habitat

Sabine is a  sanctuary, the largest coastal marsh refuge on the Gulf Coast of the United States. It is home to more than 200 species of birds, including ducks, great egrets, geese, Neotropic cormorants, raptors, snowy egrets, wading birds, and shorebirds. There is also a very large contingent of American alligators, as well as blue crabs, American mink, muskrats, coypu, North American river otters, rabbits, shrimp,  and turtles.

It includes an observation tower and fifteen knowledge stations to educate the public about Gulf Coast marshland. A second natural trail, the Blue Goose Trail is a   round trip with a scenic overlook.

Petroleum exploration is allowed on the refuge. There was an oil spill at one of the well sites in Sabine during the winter of 2002–2003. Most of the spill was cleaned up by burning the oil.

Hurricane damage

Sabine National Wildlife Refuge was in the direct path of Hurricane Rita on September 24, 2005. All of the office buildings, visitor center, and maintenance shops were damaged beyond repair and have been removed. There are three remaining structures at the refuge headquarters area that were repaired. Recreational areas along Highway 27 received varying amounts of damage to bridges, piers, observation towers, boardwalks, restroom facilities, fences, and parking lots. Some of these facilities still require repairs and refuge staff are working with state and local partners, contractors, and other federal agencies to complete the work.

West of Highway 27, Sabine refuge canals and marshes were severely affected by storm wind and water. Approximately  of refuge marshes, levees, and canals were damaged. Canals and marshes are clogged with seven million cubic meters of debris from off shore rigs and coastal communities. There are both physical and chemical hazards present throughout the refuge, many of which have settled below the marsh and water surfaces. Tanks and barrels containing hazardous liquids and gases have the potential to explode or break down and release toxins into the environment. Over 1,400 hazardous material containers have been identified and are estimated to contain between 115,000 and 350,000 gallons of hazardous liquids and gases.

Stats

 Location: 
 Elevation: 10 feet (3 m; avg)
 Area:
 Water: 39,844 acres (161 km2)
 Grassland/herbaceous/marsh: 84,667 acres (343 km2)
 Annual visitors: 300,000 (approximately)

See also

 List of National Wildlife Refuges: Louisiana

References

External links
 Sabine NWR @ the U.S. Fish & Wildlife Service
 Bird Checklists of Sabine NWS from USGS's Northern Prairie Wildlife Research Center

Protected areas of Cameron Parish, Louisiana
National Wildlife Refuges in Louisiana
Protected areas established in 1937
Wetlands and bayous of Louisiana
Landforms of Cameron Parish, Louisiana